Tennis competitions at the 2005 Games of the Small States of Europe in Andorra at the L'Aldosa Sport Complex in La Massana. The tournament took place on indoor hard courts.

References

Games of the Small States of Europe
2005 Games of the Small States of Europe
2005